Sexsacional..! (Sexsational) is a studio album by Lalo Rodríguez released in 1989. The album reached No. 3 on the Billboard Tropical Albums chart.

Track listing

Chart positions

References

1989 albums
Lalo Rodríguez albums